Andrea D'Errico (born 24 March 1992) is an Italian professional footballer who plays as an attacking midfielder or forward for  club Crotone, he's on loan from Bari.

Career 
D'Errico scored his first Serie B goal on 7 May 2021, helping Monza beat Cosenza 3–0 away from home. On 7 July 2021, he left Monza after six seasons; he scored 48 goals in 204 games in all competitions.

On 8 July 2021, D'Errico joined Serie C side Bari.

On 9 January 2023, he joined Serie C side Crotone on loan.

Honours 
Monza
 Serie C Group A: 2019–20
 Serie D Group B: 2016–17
 Scudetto Dilettanti: 2016–17

Bari
 Serie C: 2021–22 (Group C)

References

External links

 
 

1992 births
Living people
Footballers from Milan
Italian footballers
Association football forwards
Association football midfielders
Serie B players
Serie C players
Lega Pro Seconda Divisione players
Serie D players
F.C. Pavia players
S.S. Fidelis Andria 1928 players
A.S.D. Barletta 1922 players
Aurora Pro Patria 1919 players
A.C. Monza players
S.S.C. Bari players
F.C. Crotone players